Elderslea is a suburb of Upper Hutt located in the lower North Island of New Zealand, near Upper Hutt Central.

Demographics

Elderslea had a population of 3,429 at the 2018 New Zealand census, an increase of 204 people (6.3%) since the 2013 census, and an increase of 246 people (7.7%) since the 2006 census. There were 1,230 households. There were 1,656 males and 1,773 females, giving a sex ratio of 0.93 males per female. The median age was 40.7 years (compared with 37.4 years nationally), with 663 people (19.3%) aged under 15 years, 612 (17.8%) aged 15 to 29, 1,455 (42.4%) aged 30 to 64, and 702 (20.5%) aged 65 or older.

Ethnicities were 76.6% European/Pākehā, 18.1% Māori, 6.8% Pacific peoples, 10.5% Asian, and 3.4% other ethnicities (totals add to more than 100% since people could identify with multiple ethnicities).

The proportion of people born overseas was 20.7%, compared with 27.1% nationally.

Although some people objected to giving their religion, 44.4% had no religion, 42.3% were Christian, 1.8% were Hindu, 0.3% were Muslim, 1.2% were Buddhist and 3.1% had other religions.

Of those at least 15 years old, 405 (14.6%) people had a bachelor or higher degree, and 600 (21.7%) people had no formal qualifications. The median income was $27,800, compared with $31,800 nationally. The employment status of those at least 15 was that 1,290 (46.6%) people were employed full-time, 297 (10.7%) were part-time, and 132 (4.8%) were unemployed.

Education

References

Suburbs of Upper Hutt
Populated places on Te Awa Kairangi / Hutt River